The Odiel is a river in the Atlantic basin in southern Spain, more precisely in the province of Huelva, Andalusia. At the Punta del Sebo, it joins the Rio Tinto to form the Huelva Estuary. Its principal tributaries are the Escalada, Meca, Olivargas, Oraque, Santa Eulalia, and El Villar.

In Roman times it was known as the Urius, although some scholars have proposed to identify the Odiel with another ancient name normally associated with the Río Tinto (Luxia). Even before the Romans, its mouth was an important place of commerce, as can be seen by archaeological remnants from Phoenicians and Ancient Greeks, known as the "Huelva Estuary Deposit", dated 1000 BCE.

See also 
 List of rivers of Spain

Notes 

Rivers of Spain
Rivers of Andalusia
Geography of the Province of Huelva